Walter Pérez Villamonte (3 November 1936 – 29 March 2018) was a Bolivian Roman Catholic bishop.

Pérez Villamonte was born in Bolivia and was ordained to the priesthood in 1962. He served as auxiliary bishop of the Roman Catholic Archdiocese of Sucre, Bolivia, from 1995 to 1998, holding the titular bishopric of Curubis. He then served as bishop of the Roman Catholic Diocese of Potosí, Bolivia, from 1998 to 2009.

Notes

1936 births
2018 deaths
21st-century Roman Catholic bishops in Bolivia
20th-century Roman Catholic bishops in Bolivia
Roman Catholic bishops of Sucre
Roman Catholic bishops of Potosí